"Love Is Stronger Than Pride" is a song written by Rick Bowles and Doug Johnson, and recorded by American country music group Ricochet.  It was released in August 1996 as the third single from their self-titled debut album.  The song reached number 9 on the Billboard Hot Country Singles & Tracks chart in November 1996.

Music video
The music video was directed by Marc Ball, and premiered on CMT on July 24, 1996.

Chart performance
"Love Is Stronger Than Pride" debuted at number 66 on the U.S. Billboard Hot Country Singles & Tracks for the week of August 17, 1996.

References

1996 singles
1996 songs
Ricochet (band) songs
Song recordings produced by Ron Chancey
Songs written by Doug Johnson (record producer)
Columbia Records singles
Songs written by Rick Bowles